Aurora Heights is a prominent feature  long, bordering the north side of Argosy Glacier in the Miller Range. It was named by the New Zealand Geological Survey Antarctic Expedition (1961–62) for the Aurora, the ship of the Ross Sea Party of the British Trans-Antarctic Expedition (1914–17).

References
 

Mountains of Oates Land